"One Night" is a song written by Dave Bartholomew, Pearl King, and Anita Steinman.  It was an R&B hit for Smiley Lewis in 1956, before being recorded with greater commercial success by Elvis Presley in 1957.

Smiley Lewis
The original recording of the song by Smiley Lewis, for Imperial Records, is sometimes titled "One Night of Sin", in line with the original lyrics.  The single reached No.11 on the Billboard R&B chart in early 1956.  The song's composition was originally credited to Dave Bartholomew and his wife, Pearl King.

Elvis Presley
Presley recorded a version of the song with its original lyrics on January 18, 1957, but this version would not be released until 1983. Both Elvis' manager and record company had reservations about the suggestive lyrics. Elvis did not give up on the song. He continued to play with it during his spare time on the set of Loving You, finally rewriting the lyrics that he felt were holding the song captive, changing "One night of sin is what I'm now paying for" into "One night with you is what I'm now praying for."   Presley's recording credited Anita Steinman as an additional co-writer, with Bartholomew and King.

On February 23, 1957, at Radio Recorders in Los Angeles, he showed up with his new lyrics, feeling sure they would meet his label's approval. It was issued as a single in October 1958 and peaked at No. 4 on Billboard's singles chart. The song was published by Elvis Presley Music.

Presley's recording was issued as a double A-side with "I Got Stung", and reached number one twice on the UK Singles Chart.  In the U.S., "One Night", reached number four on the pop singles chart and number ten on the R&B chart. The song became the UK's 1000th number-one single upon its second release in January 2005. It was also his last single to be issued on 78 RPM records in the United States.  On 12 February 1959, it became the first song to reach No. 1 on the Irish Music Charts Top 10, when they were being printed in the Evening Herald. It spent one week at the top spot.

Rock critic Pete Johnson observed that the song contains a triple negative with the lyrics "I ain't never did no wrong".

Personnel 
 Scotty Moore, guitar
 Elvis Presley, lead guitar, vocals
 Bill Black, bass
 D.J. Fontana, drums
 Dudley Brooks, piano
 The Jordanaires, vocals

Other versions
1961: Fats Domino on his album Let the Four Winds Blow
1972: Jeannie C. Riley on her album Down to Earth (MGM Records – SE-4849)
1972: Shakin' Stevens on the album "Rockin' & Shakin' With Shakin' Stevens & The Sunsets"
1975: English glam rock band Mud on their album Mud Rock Volume 2 (reached #32 in the UK charts)
1978: Folk singer/songwriter Arlo Guthrie performed the song live with back-up band Shenandoah on his concert album entitled One Night
1988: Guana Batz on their album Rough Edges
1989: Joe Cocker titled his remake "One Night of Sin" on his album of the same name
2006: Billy Ray Cyrus recorded this song during the sessions for his album Wanna Be Your Joe
2007: Corinne Bailey Rae performed the song on Goin' Home: A Tribute to Fats Domino
2020: Glenn Danzig released the song as a single from the Danzig album Danzig Sings Elvis

References

Source

External links
One Night / I Got Stung Guide part of The Elvis Presley Record Research Database

1958 singles
Elvis Presley songs
Number-one singles in Scotland
UK Singles Chart number-one singles
Songs written by Dave Bartholomew
Songs written by Earl King
1958 songs
RCA Records singles
Irish Singles Chart number-one singles